Nigel Robert Gray (born 2 November 1956) is an English former professional football centre back, best remembered for his 9-year spell in the Football League with Orient. He also played league football for Swindon Town, Brentford, Aldershot and Charlton Athletic.

Career statistics

References

1956 births
Living people
Footballers from Fulham
English footballers
Association football central defenders
Leyton Orient F.C. players
Swindon Town F.C. players
Charlton Athletic F.C. players
Brentford F.C. players
Aldershot F.C. players
Enfield F.C. players
Wycombe Wanderers F.C. players
Tooting & Mitcham United F.C. players
English Football League players
National League (English football) players
Isthmian League players